Christopher Ricardo Junior Pearson (born 21 January 2003) is a Jamaican professional footballer who plays as a midfielder for USL Championship club FC Tulsa.

Club career

Youth
Pearson spent four years at Kingston College from 2019 to 2022. Pearson was named the MVP of the league in 2022 after finishing as its leading goalscorer with nine goals.

Cavalier
In 2022, Pearson signed with National Premier League side Cavalier, where he debuted on 14 March 2022, scoring an 89th–minute goal against Molynes United.

FC Tulsa
On 19 July 2022, Pearson made the move to the United States, joining USL Championship side FC Tulsa. Following the 2022 season, he re-signed with the club for 2023.

International career
Pearson has been capped five times at under-20 level for the Jamaican national team. He was also selected by Jamaica's senior squad three times in its final 2022 FIFA World Cup qualification window in March 2022 in fixtures against El Salvador, Canada, and Honduras.

References 

2003 births
Living people
Association football midfielders
Cavalier F.C. players
Expatriate soccer players in the United States
Jamaican expatriate footballers
Jamaican expatriate sportspeople in the United States
Jamaican footballers
FC Tulsa players
USL Championship players